Apamea ferrago is a moth belonging to the family Noctuidae. The species was first described by Eduard Friedrich Eversmann in 1837.

It is native to Europe.

References

Noctuidae
Moths of Europe
Taxa described in 1837
Taxa named by Eduard Friedrich Eversmann